The Catapaecilmatini are a small tribe of butterflies in the family Lycaenidae.

Genera

The tribe contains a mere two genera at present, but as not all Theclinae have been assigned to tribes, the following list is preliminary:

 Acupicta
 Catapaecilma

References 

 
Theclinae
Butterfly tribes